

Friedrich Herrlein (27 April 1889  – 28 July 1974) was a German general (General der Infanterie) in the Wehrmacht during World War II who commanded the LV Corps. He was a recipient of the Knight's Cross of the Iron Cross of by Nazi Germany. Herrlein surrendered to the British troops in 1945 and was interned until 1948.

Awards

 Knight's Cross of the Iron Cross on 22 August 1941 as Generalmajor and commander of 18. Infanterie-Division

References

Citations

Bibliography

 

1889 births
1974 deaths
Military personnel  from Koblenz
German Army generals of World War II
Generals of Infantry (Wehrmacht)
German Army personnel of World War I
Recipients of the Knight's Cross of the Iron Cross
German prisoners of war in World War II held by the United Kingdom
People from the Rhine Province
Recipients of the clasp to the Iron Cross, 1st class
Reichswehr personnel
20th-century Freikorps personnel